In the mathematical fields of the calculus of variations and differential geometry, the variational vector field is a certain type of vector field defined on the tangent bundle of a differentiable manifold which gives rise to variations along a vector field in the manifold itself.

Specifically, let X be a vector field on M.  Then X generates a one-parameter group of local diffeomorphisms FlXt, the flow along X.  The differential of FlXt gives, for each t, a mapping

where TM denotes the tangent bundle of M.  This is a one-parameter group of local diffeomorphisms of the tangent bundle.  The variational vector field of X, denoted by T(X) is the tangent to the flow of d FlXt.

References

 

Calculus of variations